Zographus pulverulentus is a species of beetle in the family Cerambycidae. It was described by Nonfried in 1906, originally as a varietas of Zographus aulicus. It is known from the Democratic Republic of the Congo and South Africa.

References

Sternotomini
Beetles described in 1906